Nate Mohr (born March 3, 1983) is an American mixed martial artist, formerly fought in the Lightweight division of the Ultimate Fighting Championship.

Mixed martial arts career
Mohr made his professional mixed martial arts debut on August 15, 2003, facing Cain Rizzo at Extreme Challenge 52. He won the fight via second round submission. He also competed in an amateur fight, defeating Tyler Combs via guillotine choke at XFO 6 on June 25, 2005.

Ultimate Fighting Championship
With a record of 7–3, Mohr signed with the UFC in early 2007. He made his debut against Kurt Pellegrino at UFC Fight Night 9 on April 5, 2007. He lost the fight via Achilles lock submission. Mohr then faced Luke Caudillo at UFC Fight Night 50 on June 12, 2007. He won the fight via unanimous decision.

Mohr was expected to face Jeremy Stephens at UFC 76 on September 22, 2007. However, Mohr was forced out of the bout due to injury, and was replaced by Diego Saraiva. For his third fight in the promotion, he faced Manvel Gamburyan at UFC 79 on December 29, 2007. He lost the fight via Achilles lock.

Returning from a one-year layoff due to injuries, Mohr faced Dennis Siver at UFC 93 on January 17, 2009. He lost the round via spinning kick TKO, and after dropping to 1–3 inside the promotion, Mohr was subsequently released from the promotion.

Post-UFC career
He faced Danny Rodriguez at XFO 28 on February 27, 2009. He won the fight via TKO.

In his most recent fight, Mohr faced Lenny Lovato at GFC 2: Unstoppable on June 19, 2009. He lost the fight via unanimous decision.

After leaving MMA, he graduated from Chicago Medical School - Rosalind Franklin University. He now resides in Des Moines, IA, working as a surgical resident.

Mixed martial arts record

|-
| Loss
| align=center| 9–7
| Lenny Lovato
| Decision (unanimous)
| GFC 2 - Unstoppable
| 
| align=center| 3
| align=center| 5:00
| Albuquerque, New Mexico, United States
| 
|-
| Win
| align=center| 9–6
| Danny Rodriguez
| TKO (punches)
| XFO - Xtreme Fighting Organization 28
| 
| align=center| 3
| align=center| 4:07
| Lakemoor, Illinois, United States
| 
|-
| Loss
| align=center| 8–6
| Dennis Siver
| TKO (spinning back kick & punches)
| UFC 93
| 
| align=center| 3
| align=center| 3:27
| Dublin, Ireland
| 
|-
| Loss
| align=center| 8–5
| Manvel Gamburyan
| Submission (Achilles lock)
| UFC 79
| 
| align=center| 1
| align=center| 1:31
| Las Vegas, Nevada, United States
| 
|-
| Win
| align=center| 8–4
| Luke Caudillo
| Decision (unanimous)
| UFC Fight Night 10
| 
| align=center| 3
| align=center| 5:00
| Hollywood, Florida, United States
| 
|-
| Loss
| align=center| 7–4
| Kurt Pellegrino
| Submission (Achilles lock)
| UFC Fight Night: Stevenson vs. Guillard
| 
| align=center| 1
| align=center| 2:58
| Las Vegas, Nevada, United States
| 
|-
| Win
| align=center| 7–3
| Cody Shipp
| TKO (punches)
| KOTC: Hard Knocks
| 
| align=center| 1
| align=center| 2:59
| Rockford, Illinois, United States
| 
|-
| Win
| align=center| 6–3
| Norm Alexander
| TKO (punches)
| XFO 13 - Operation Beatdown
| 
| align=center| 2
| align=center| 1:30
| Hoffman Estates, Illinois, United States
| 
|-
| Win
| align=center| 5–3
| Darren Cotton
| TKO (punches)
| XFO 12 - Outdoor War
| 
| align=center| 2
| align=center| 0:19
| Island Lake, Illinois, United States
| 
|-
| Win
| align=center| 4–3
| Alex Carter
| TKO (punches)
| XFO 11 - Champions
| 
| align=center| 1
| align=center| 0:29
| Lakemoor, Illinois, United States
| 
|-
| Loss
| align=center| 3–3
| Donald Cerrone
| Submission (triangle choke)
| ROF 21 - Full Blast
| 
| align=center| 1
| align=center| 1:42
| Castle Rock, Colorado, United States
| 
|-
| Loss
| align=center| 3–2
| Jay Ellis
| Submission (rear-naked choke)
| XFO 9 - Xtreme Fighting Organization 9
| 
| align=center| 1
| align=center| 3:37
| Lakemoor, Illinois, United States
| 
|-
| Win
| align=center| 3–1
| Enrique Guzman
| TKO (punches)
| Combat - Do Fighting Challenge 4
| 
| align=center| 1
| align=center| N/A
| Illinois, United States
| 
|-
| Win
| align=center| 2–1
| Don Hamilton
| Submission (punches)
| IC 15 - Iowa Challenge 15
| 
| align=center| 1
| align=center| 1:19
| Waterloo, Iowa, United States
| 
|-
| Loss
| align=center| 1–1
| John Strawn
| Submission (rear-naked choke)
| EC 53 - Extreme Challenge 53
| 
| align=center| 2
| align=center| 2:28
| Iowa City, Iowa, United States
| 
|-
| Win
| align=center| 1–0
| Cain Rizzo
| Submission (punches)
| EC 52 - Extreme Challenge 52
| 
| align=center| 2
| align=center| 2:15
| Rock Island, Illinois, United States
|

Amateur mixed martial arts record

|-
|Win
|align=center|1–0
|Tyler Combs
|Submission (guillotine choke)
|XFO 6: Judgement Day
|
|align=center|1
|align=center|2:58
|Lakemoor, Illinois, United States
|

References

External links

 
 Nate Mohr - from UFC Fans

1983 births
Living people
American male mixed martial artists
Mixed martial artists from Iowa
Lightweight mixed martial artists
Sportspeople from Davenport, Iowa
People from Crystal Lake, Illinois
Ultimate Fighting Championship male fighters